Saint Ariadne of Phrygia (died 130 AD) is a 2nd-century Christian saint. According to legend, she was a slave in the household of a Phrygian prince. She refused to participate in rites to a pagan god as part of the prince's birthday celebration. As she was fleeing the Roman authorities, she fell through a chasm in a ridge and was entombed.

Notes

130 deaths
Saints from Roman Anatolia
2nd-century Christian saints
Saints of Roman Phrygia
Year of birth unknown